The 2012 national road cycling championships began in New Zealand with the time trial event (both men and women) on January 6. On January 7 the Women's Road Race.

Jerseys
The winner of each national championship wears the national jersey in all their races for the next year in the respective discipline, apart from the World Championships and the Olympics, or unless they are wearing a category leader's jersey in a stage race. Most national champion jerseys tend to represent a country's flag or use the colours from it. Jerseys may also feature traditional sporting colours of a country that are not derived from a national flag, such as the National colours of Australia on the jerseys of Australian national champions.

2012 champions

Men's Elite

Women's

Notes

References

External links

National Cycling Championships, 2012
National road cycling championships by year